The 2012 India Super Series was the fourth super series tournament of the 2012 BWF Super Series. The tournament took place in New Delhi, India from 24–29 April 2012 and had out a total purse of $200,000.

Men's singles

Seeds

  Lee Chong Wei
  Peter Gade
  Chen Jin
  Sho Sasaki
  Lee Hyun-il
  Simon Santoso
  Taufik Hidayat
  Jan Ø. Jørgensen

Top half

Bottom half

Finals

Women's singles

Seeds

  Wang Shixian
  Li Xuerui
  Saina Nehwal
  Jiang Yanjiao
  Tine Baun
  Juliane Schenk
  Ratchanok Inthanon
  Sung Ji-hyun

Top half

Bottom half

Finals

Men's doubles

Seeds

  Jung Jae-sung / Lee Yong-dae
  Ko Sung-hyun / Yoo Yeon-seong
  Chai Biao / Guo Zhendong
  Muhammad Ahsan / Bona Septano
  Hirokatsu Hashimoto / Noriyasu Hirata
  Koo Kien Keat / Tan Boon Heong
  Naoki Kawamae / Shoji Sato
  Alvent Yulianto Chandra / Hendra Aprida Gunawan

Top half

Bottom half

Finals

Women's doubles

Seeds

  Ha Jung-eun / Kim Min-jung
  Mizuki Fujii / Reika Kakiiwa
  Miyuki Maeda / Satoko Suetsuna
  Shizuka Matsuo / Mami Naito
  Meiliana Jauhari / Greysia Polii
  Jung Kyung-eun / Kim Ha-na
  Poon Lok Yan / Tse Ying Suet
  Shinta Mulia Sari / Lei Yao

Top half

Bottom half

Finals

Mixed doubles

Seeds

  Xu Chen / Ma Jin
  Tantowi Ahmad / Lilyana Natsir
  Lee Yong-dae / Ha Jung-eun
  Chan Peng Soon / Goh Liu Ying
  Sudket Prapakamol / Saralee Thoungthongkam
 / Chris Adcock / Imogen Bankier
  Shintaro Ikeda / Reiko Shiota
  Aleksandr Nikolaenko / Valeria Sorokina

Top half

Bottom half

Finals

References

India
India Open (badminton)
India Super Series
Sport in New Delhi